1961 Soviet Class B was the twelfth season of the Soviet Class B football competitions since their establishment in 1950. It was also the 21st season of what was eventually became known as the Soviet First League.

Russian Federation

I Zone

Notes:
 Textilshchik Kostroma was called Spartak.

II Zone

Notes:
 Trud Glukhovo relocated to Noginsk.
 Spartak Smolensk was called Textilshchik.

III Zone

Notes:
 Sokol Saratov was called Lokomotiv.
 Spartak Ryazan was called Trud.
 Torpedo Lipetsk was called Trudoviye Rezervy.

IV Zone

Notes:
 Dinamo Makhachkala was called Temp.

V Zone

VI Zone

Notes:
 Tomich Tomsk was called SibElectroMotor.
 Angara Irkutsk was called Mashinostroitel.
 Baykal Ulan-Ude was called Lokomotiv.

Final
 [Oct 24 – Nov 5, Krasnodar]

Ukraine

Final
 Chernomorets Odessa  2-1 0-0 SKA Odessa

Union republics

I Zone

Notes:
 SelMash Liepaja was called Krasny Metallurg.

Number of teams by republics

II Zone

Notes:
 Nairi Yerevan was called Burevestnik.
 Alga Frunze was called Spartak.
 Metallurg Chimkent was called Yenbek.
 Temp Sumgait was called Metallurg.
 Start Tashkent was called Mehnat.

Number of teams by republics

Promotion/relegation Tournament
 [Oct 25 – Nov 5, Kishinev]

See also
 Soviet First League

External links
 1961 Soviet Championship and Cup
 1961 season at rsssf.com

1961
2
Soviet
Soviet